is a Japanese actress.

Filmography

Film
 Kimi yo Fundo no Kawa o Watare (1976)
 Never Give Up (1978)
 Avalokitesvara (2013)
 Yanagawa (2021)

Television  
 Akai Meiro (1974–75)

References

External links

 

Japanese actresses
Living people
1950 births
Actors from Aichi Prefecture